Nico Mikael Ruponen (born 3 February 1989) is a Swedish badminton player. In 2012, he won the Kharkiv International in the mixed doubles event partnered with Amanda Högström. In 2016, he and Richard Eidestedt had to battle through the qualification round at the Orleans International tournament before reach the finals, finally they won the men's doubles title after beat Hardianto and Haryanto of Indonesia. He also became the runner-up at the 2016 Canada Open Grand Prix tournament in the mixed doubles event with Högström.

Achievements

BWF Grand Prix 
The BWF Grand Prix had two levels, the Grand Prix and Grand Prix Gold. It was a series of badminton tournaments sanctioned by the Badminton World Federation (BWF) and played between 2007 and 2017.

Mixed doubles

  BWF Grand Prix Gold tournament
  BWF Grand Prix tournament

BWF International Challenge/Series 
Men's doubles

Mixed doubles

  BWF International Challenge tournament
  BWF International Series tournament
  BWF Future Series tournament

References

External links 
 

1989 births
Living people
People from Täby Municipality
Sportspeople from Stockholm County
Swedish male badminton players
21st-century Swedish people